Moonbound is a 2021 German-Austrian computer-animated fantasy adventure comedy film directed by Ali Samadi Ahadi.

Plot 
When Peter sets out on a magical journey to rescue his little sister Anne, he needs to travel to mysterious territory: the Moon! Anne was kidnapped by the evil Moon Man when she tried to help the beetle Mr. Zoomzeman in search for his wife. On his fantastic adventure, Peter lands on the Star Meadow where he meets the sleepy Mr. Sandman. He knows, only at the Night Fairy’s dinner in the castle in the clouds, they can find out where Anne is – but there aren’t enough seats for everyone. So they join the wild race along the Milky Way against the five Spirits of Nature: Storm Giant, Lightning Witch, Henry Hail, Rainy Robin and Mother Frost…

Cast
Aleks Le as Peter
Howard Nightingall as Mr. Zoomzeman/Rainy Robin
Lilian Gartner as Anne/Shooting Star
Raphael von Bargen as Sandman/Mr. Ladybug (credited as Raphael van Bargen)
Drew Sarich as Moonman/Milkyway Man/Herschel
Cindy Robinson as Nightfairy
Melissa Mabie as Lightning Witch (credited as Mellisa Mabei)
Michael Smulik as Storm Giant
Elisabeth Kanettis as Mother/Shooting Star
Barbara Spitz as Mrs. Zoomzeman
Jim Libby as Bully
Dennis Kozeluh as Henry Hail
Jacob Banigan as Keppler
Magarethe Tiesl as Mother Frost
Bastian Wilplinger as Bouncer 1
Martin Repka as Bouncer 2
Alix Martin as Mrs. Ladybug

Production 
The music was recorded by the Vienna Radio Symphony Orchestra at Synchron Stage Vienna in Austria.

Reception 
The film received negative reviews, with 17% score on Rotten Tomatoes according to 6 reviews.

See also

 Peter in Magicland
 Little Peter's Journey to the Moon

References

External links
 
 

2021 films
2021 computer-animated films
Austrian adventure films
Austrian animated films
Austrian comedy films
Austrian fantasy films
German adventure comedy films
German animated fantasy films
German fantasy comedy films
Animated films about bears
Animated films about insects
Animated films about siblings
Animated films based on children's books
Moon in film
2020s English-language films